Kim Dickey is a ceramic artist. She is also Professor of Ceramics at the University of Colorado, in Boulder, Colorado.
She obtained her BFA from the Rhode Island School of Design, in Providence, Rhode Island, followed by an MFA in ceramics from the New York State College of Ceramics at Alfred University. 
Dickey's work explores how people construct environments and she ponders how people create meaning with the objects that surround them. Through this lens, Dickey creates works that are platforms on which memories, myths, nostalgia, and imagination can play.

Dickey's most familiar and controversial works are a series of functional handheld female urinals, constructed from porcelain. Dickey's porcelain sculptural work was featured in an extensive retrospective exhibition in 2016 titled Words Are Leaves at the Museum of Contemporary Art Denver.

Bibliography links
University of Colorado Museum
Philadelphia City Paper

References

External links
 Official website

Year of birth missing (living people)
Living people
American ceramists
Rhode Island School of Design alumni
New York State College of Ceramics alumni
University of Colorado faculty
Artists from Colorado